The Woman Wins is a 1918 British silent crime film directed by Frank Wilson and starring Violet Hopson, Trevor Bland and Cameron Carr. It was based on a novel by Cecil Bullivant.

Cast
 Violet Hopson - Brenda Marsh 
 Trevor Bland - Hugh Fraser 
 Cameron Carr - Raymond Vascour 
 George Dewhurst - Hadley Barfield 
 Arthur Walcott - John Farley 
 Henry S. Creagh - Justin Marsh 
 J. Hastings Batson - Admiral Fraser 
 Vera Cornish - Mrs. Fane

References

External links

1918 films
British crime films
Films directed by Frank Wilson
Films based on British novels
British silent feature films
British black-and-white films
1918 crime films
1910s English-language films
1910s British films